Peter Byers (born 20 October 1984) is an Antiguan footballer who plays professionally for SAP FC and the Antigua and Barbuda national team as a striker.

Club career
Born in Bolans Village, Byers spent his early career in his native Antigua and Barbuda with SAP, and in Trinidad and Tobago with San Juan Jabloteh.

Byers joined Montreal Impact of the USL First Division on 27 August 2008, a week before the roster freeze date. He was invited to trial with the San Jose Earthquakes during the 2009 MLS pre-season, but signed a new two-year deal with the Impact on 18 February 2009, after failing to agree a contract with the Earthquakes. In the 2009 season he was briefly loaned to Trois-Rivières Attak in the Canadian Soccer League, where he appeared in 2 matches and scored 1 goal. During the 2009 USL season playoffs, Byers scored the opening goal for the Impact in a 2–1 victory over the Puerto Rico Islanders, which allowed the Impact to advance to the finals. Their opponents in the finals were the Vancouver Whitecaps, and on 10 October 2009, in the first match of the finals, Byers scored the second goal in 3–2 victory.

On 3 August 2010, Byers was suspended for breaching a team rule. A week after his suspension was issued, the Montreal Impact announced the release of Byers from his contract for breaching club policy.

Byers returned home to Antigua to join Parham in the Antigua and Barbuda Premier Division, before having a brief stint with the Antigua Barracuda FC in the USL Professional Division, during which he scored four goals in seven games. Byers transferred to the Los Angeles Blues on 3 June 2011. Byers had a trial with V-league defending champions Sông Lam Nghệ An F.C. but was ultimately not offered a contract and returned to the Barracudas.

Following the 2012 USL Pro season, Byers signed for Central FC of the TT Pro League.

International career
Byers made his debut for Antigua and Barbuda in 2004, and has played for them in 90 matches, scoring 44 goals.

International goals
Scores and results list Antigua and Barbuda's goal tally first.

References

1984 births
Living people
People from Saint Peter Parish, Antigua
Antigua and Barbuda footballers
Association football forwards
SAP F.C. players
San Juan Jabloteh F.C. players
Montreal Impact (1992–2011) players
Trois-Rivières Attak players
Antigua Barracuda F.C. players
Orange County SC players
Central F.C. players
TT Pro League players
USL First Division players
USSF Division 2 Professional League players
Canadian Soccer League (1998–present) players
USL Championship players
Antigua and Barbuda international footballers
2014 Caribbean Cup players
Antigua and Barbuda expatriate footballers
Antigua and Barbuda expatriate sportspeople in Canada
Antigua and Barbuda expatriate sportspeople in Trinidad and Tobago
Expatriate footballers in Trinidad and Tobago
Expatriate soccer players in Canada
Expatriate soccer players in the United States
Expatriate footballers in the Dominican Republic